Boiler Works is a steel and bronze sculpture by Thomas Jay, installed on the Washington State Capitol campus in Olympia, Washington, United States. The artwork was dedicated in 1973 and has been vandalized multiple times.

References

1973 establishments in Washington (state)
1973 sculptures
Bronze sculptures in Washington (state)
Outdoor sculptures in Olympia, Washington
Steel sculptures in Washington (state)
Vandalized works of art in Washington (state)